Chauncey N. Lawton House, also known as the office of Diamond & Diamond Attorneys at Law, is a historic home located at South Bend, St. Joseph County, Indiana. It was built in 1872, and is a two-story, asymmetrical plan, Italian Villa style brick dwelling.  It features a three-story tower; round arched openings; polygonal bays; and paired, scrolled, and incised brackets.

It was listed on the National Register of Historic Places in 1983.

References

Houses on the National Register of Historic Places in Indiana
Italianate architecture in Indiana
Houses completed in 1872
Buildings and structures in South Bend, Indiana
Houses in St. Joseph County, Indiana
National Register of Historic Places in St. Joseph County, Indiana